The Apprentices Act 1536 (28 Hen 8 c 5) was an Act of the Parliament of England.

This Act was repealed from the beginning to the words "more playnly may appere" by section 1 of, and Schedule 1 to, the Statute Law Revision Act 1948.

The whole Act, so far as unrepealed, was repealed by section 1 of, and Part VII of the Schedule to, the Statute Law (Repeals) Act 1969.

Section 1
This section, from "nor by any" to "Henry the Eighth", was repealed by section 1 of, and the Schedule to, the Statute Law Revision Act 1887.

References
Halsbury's Statutes,

Acts of the Parliament of England (1485–1603)
1536 in law
1536 in England
Apprenticeship